The blocks world is a planning domain in artificial intelligence. The algorithm is similar to a set of wooden blocks of various shapes and colors sitting on a table.  The goal is to build one or more vertical stacks of blocks. Only one block may be moved at a time: it may either be placed on the table or placed atop another block. Because of this, any blocks that are, at a given time, under another block cannot be moved. Moreover, some kinds of blocks cannot have other blocks stacked on top of them.

The simplicity of this toy world lends itself readily to classical symbolic artificial intelligence approaches, in which the world is modeled as a set of abstract symbols which may be reasoned about.

Motivation
Artificial Intelligence can be researched in theory and with practical applications. The problem with most practical application is, that the engineers don't know how to program an AI system. Instead of rejecting the challenge at all the idea is to invent an easy to solve domain which is called a toy problem. Toy problems were invented with the aim to program an AI which can solve it. The blocks world domain is an example for a toy problem. Its major advantage over more realistic AI applications is, that many algorithms and software programs are available which can handle the situation. This allows to compare different theories against each other.

In its basic form, the blocks world problem consists of cubes in the same size which have all the color black. A mechanical robot arm has to pick and place the cubes. More complicated derivatives of the problem consist of cubes in different sizes, shapes and colors. From an algorithm perspective, blocks world is an np-hard search and planning problem. The task is to bring the system from an initial state into a goal state.

Automated planning and scheduling problem are usually described in the Planning Domain Definition Language (PDDL) notation which is an AI planning language for symbolic manipulation tasks. If something was formulated in the PDDL notation, it is called a domain. Therefore, the task of stapling blocks is a blocks world domain  which stays in contrast to other planning problems like the dock worker robot domain and the monkey and banana problem.

Example setup in blocks world

Theses/projects which took place in a blocks world
 Terry Winograd's SHRDLU
 Patrick Winston's Learning Structural Descriptions from Examples and Copy Demo
 Gerald Jay Sussman's Sussman anomaly

Decision problem (Gupta and Nau, 1992): Given a starting Blocks World, an ending Blocks World, and an integer L > 0, is there a way to move the blocks to change the starting position to the ending position with L or less steps?

This decision problem is NP-hard.

See also 

 Blocksworld from Linden Lab
 Toy problem

References

Sources
 

History of artificial intelligence